X4, X-4 or x4 may refer to:

 BMW X4, a German crossover automobile
 Sehol X4, a Chinese crossover automobile
 Honda X4, a Japanese motorcycle
 Moto X4, an Android Smartphone
 Mega Man X4, a video game
 Naish X4, a kitesurfing kite
 The Norteños street gang
 Northrop X-4 Bantam, an early jet age research aircraft
 A common name for petroleum ether
 A four-lane PCI Express slot
 Ruhrstahl X-4, a German World War II air-to-air guided missile
 Ultimate X4, a comic-book crossover in the Ultimate Marvel Universe
 X4 (New York City bus), an express bus route
 Stagecoach Gold bus route X4, a bus route in the United Kingdom
 X4 virus, a T-cell tropic HIV
 X-Men Origins: Wolverine, a 2009 film
 X-Men: Days of Future Past, a 2014 film
 WordPerfect X4, a version of word processing software
 X4: Foundations, a 2018 video game

See also
 4X (disambiguation)